The Communauté de communes des Hauts de Flandre is a communauté de communes in the Nord département and in the Hauts-de-France région of France. It was formed on 1 January 2014 by the merger of the former Communauté de communes de la Colme, Communauté de communes du canton de Bergues, Communauté de communes de Flandre and the Communauté de communes de l'Yser. Its seat is in Bergues. Its area is 448.5 km2, and its population was 53,584 in 2018.

Communes
The Communauté de communes des Hauts de Flandre consists of the following 40 communes:
 
 Bambecque 
 Bergues 
 Bierne 
 Bissezeele 
 Bollezeele 
 Brouckerque 
 Broxeele 
 Cappelle-Brouck 
 Crochte 
 Drincham 
 Eringhem 
 Esquelbecq 
 Herzeele 
 Holque
 Hondschoote 
 Hoymille 
 Killem 
 Lederzeele 
 Ledringhem 
 Looberghe 
 Merckeghem 
 Millam 
 Nieurlet 
 Oost-Cappel 
 Pitgam 
 Quaëdypre 
 Rexpoëde
 Saint-Momelin 
 Saint-Pierre-Brouck 
 Socx 
 Steene 
 Uxem 
 Volckerinckhove
 Warhem 
 Watten 
 West-Cappel 
 Wormhout 
 Wulverdinghe 
 Wylder 
 Zegerscappel

References 

Hauts de Flandre
Hauts de Flandre